Teldenia vestigiata is a moth in the family Drepanidae. It was described by Arthur Gardiner Butler in 1880. It is found in India in Darjeeling, Sikkim and  Kanara.

References

Moths described in 1880
Drepaninae